Ernst Eklund may refer to:

 Ernst Eklund (actor) (1882–1971), Swedish actor
 Ernst Eklund (diver) (1894–?), Swedish diver